Petar Luković (born 21 January 1951 in Kraljevo), nicknamed "Pero s onog sveta", is a journalist, newspaper editor and former rock critic. He attended the Sixth Belgrade Gymnasium, graduated from the Faculty of Mechanical Engineering at the University of Belgrade.

He started his career in 1976 as a journalist for Duga magazine. As a political and rock critic, he wrote for many Yugoslav newspapers and magazines, such as Rock, Džuboks, Mladost, Polet, a Thursday supplement of Slovenian newspaper, Delo, Nedelja, Nedjeljna Dalmacija/Slobodna Dalmacija, Politika, Oslobođenje, Vjesnik, Rock 82, and others. He was the editor-in-chief of the magazine Tajne, which deals with paranormal phenomena, and the magazine Sex Club, the first porn magazine in Serbia. He was the editor-in-chief of the portal E-novine from its establishment until March 1, 2016, when the portal ceased to operate.

In the period from 1991 to 1996, he worked for the Belgrade weekly Vreme, where he was also deputy editor-in-chief for a time. From 1996 to 1998, he wrote for Naša Borba.

He has been writing for Feral, satirical weekly addition of the Croatian daily from Split, Nedjeljna Dalmacija/Slobodna Dalmacija since its foundation in 1984, with a column titled "Pero sa onog sveta", which gained him a long-lasting eponymous moniker. He cooperates with the magazines Reporter from Belgrade, Dani from Sarajevo and Mladina from Ljubljana.

In the period from January 1996 until the beginning of the bombing of FR Yugoslavia in March 1999, he was the editor-in-chief of the magazine X Zabava.

After 2000, he worked for the owner of RTV Pink, Željko Mitrović.

He also published three books: A Better Past (1989), Ćorava Kutija (1993) and Godine Raspada — Chronicle of Serbian Decline (2000).

He received the Dragiša Kašiković Award in 1994 as one of the first three laureates, and the Staša Marinković Award of the daily newspaper Danas was received in 2001.

Petar Luković was on the electoral list of LDP, GSS, SDU, LSV for the parliamentary elections in Serbia held on January 21, 2007, but he failed to become a deputy due to the insufficient number of votes received by this coalition.

Currently, as of 2022, Luković is editor-in-chief and columnist at the online magazine XXZ Regional Portal, based in Belgrade.

See also
Boris Dežulović
Viktor Ivančić

References

External links 
 Збирка Луковићевих изјава за „Пешчаник”
 Е-новине Archived at the website (March 1, 2021)

Serbian journalists
People from Kraljevo
1951 births
Living people